Safet is an Albanian and Bosnian masculine given name. It may refer to:
Safet Isović, Bosnian sevdalinka performer
Safet Jahič, Slovenian footballer
Safet Nadarević, Bosnian footballer
Safet Osja, Albanian footballer
Safet Plakalo, Bosnian playwright
Safet Sušić, Bosnian football coach and former player 
Safvet-beg Bašagić, Bosnian writer 

Bosniak masculine given names
Bosnian masculine given names